Monica Johnson (February 21, 1946 – November 1, 2010) was an American screenwriter whose film credits included Mother, Lost in America, Modern Romance, Jekyll and Hyde... Together Again and The Muse. Her television credits included The Mary Tyler Moore Show, Laverne & Shirley and It's Garry Shandling's Show. She was a frequent collaborator with Albert Brooks.

Early life
Johnson was born Monica Lenore Belson in 1946 in Colorado, but was raised in El Centro, California and spent her early years in medical and dental assistants’ school.

Career
Her brother, Jerry Belson, an Emmy Award-winning screenwriter and film producer, hired her to type scripts for the TV series The Odd Couple around 1972; noticing that his sister added jokes to the scripts which met with the producers' approval, he suggested that she partner with Marilyn Suzanne Miller to form a writing team. Initially working under her married name of Monica Mcgowan in 1973, she and Miller wrote three scripts for The Mary Tyler Moore Show. For the second script, having remarried, she was credited as Monica Mcgowan Johnson. By the time of third script in 1974, she was credited as Monica Johnson, the professional name she used for the rest of her career.

Miller and Johnson broke up as a writing team in 1974; Miller became one of the original writers for Saturday Night Live in 1975.

Johnson later became a writer/producer on Laverne & Shirley, and worked on a couple of TV movies, then began her long-term screenwriting collaboration with Albert Brooks in 1979 with the film Real Life. The two co-wrote five more of Brooks' films over the following two decades.

Johnson wrote the book Penny Saver (unpublished) and the movie Marrying for Money (unproduced), and began doing art work.

Personal life
Johnson, a resident of Palm Springs, California, died of esophageal cancer at Cedars-Sinai Medical Center in Los Angeles on November 1, 2010, aged 64. She was survived by her seventh husband, Charles Lohr; a daughter, Heidi Johnson; and a brother, Gordon Belson.

Awards
 National Society of Film Critics Award for Best Screenplay, 1985, Lost in America
 National Society of Film Critics Award for Best Screenplay, 1996, Mother

Filmography
 The Paul Lynde Show (1973, TV)
 The Mary Tyler Moore Show (1973, TV)
 Paul Sand in Friends and Lovers (1974, TV)
 The Cheerleaders (1976, TV)
 Laverne & Shirley (1977, TV)
 The Plant Family (1978, TV)
 Real Life (1979)
 Americathon (1979)
 Modern Romance (1981)
 Jekyll and Hyde... Together Again (1982)
 Lost in America (1985)
 It's Garry Shandling's Show (1990, TV)
 Good Sports (1991, TV)
 The Scout (1994)
 Mother (1996)
 The Muse (1999)

References

External links
 
 https://www.primoquotes.com/author/Monica+Johnson

1946 births
2010 deaths
Screenwriters from California
American television writers
People from El Centro, California
American women screenwriters
American women television writers
Deaths from cancer in California
Deaths from esophageal cancer
Writers from Palm Springs, California
Screenwriters from Colorado
21st-century American women